Derreck Calvert (22 December 1919 – 25 December 2003) was an Australian cricketer. He played three first-class matches for Tasmania between 1946 and 1953.

See also
 List of Tasmanian representative cricketers

References

External links
 

1919 births
2003 deaths
Australian cricketers
Tasmania cricketers
Cricketers from Tasmania